Peet Celliers Marais is a South African rugby union footballer. His playing position is lock.

Career

After playing for local Welkom-based side  at various youth level, he joined Durban-based side  at the start of 2009.

He was included in the ' Super Rugby squad in 2013 and 2014, but failed to make a single Super Rugby appearance.

Brive
In May 2014, French media outlets reported that he signed a two-year deal with French side CA Brive for the 2014–2015 season. This was confirmed by the club on 2 July 2014.

Personal

He is the brother of former  player Jandré Marais.

References

External links

itsrugby.co.uk Profile
Sharks Profile

1990 births
Living people
Afrikaner people
CA Brive players
Expatriate rugby union players in France
Rugby union locks
Rugby union players from Welkom
Sharks (Currie Cup) players
South Africa Under-20 international rugby union players
South African expatriate rugby union players
South African expatriate sportspeople in France
South African rugby union players